A plain loaf, slices of which are known in Scots as plain breid (pronounced ), is a traditional style of loaf made chiefly in Scotland and Ireland. It has a dark, well-fired crust on the top and bottom of the bread.

There is no crust on the sides due to the unbaked loaves being stuck together in batches, baked together then torn into individual loaves afterwards. The term batch loaf is sometimes used. This was once the more widely available style of loaf in comparison to the now more common pan loaf.

See also
 List of breads
 List of British breads

References

External links 

Scottish breads
Yeast breads